A general election was held in the U.S. state of Indiana on November 8, 2016. Elections were held for President of the United States, United States Senator, Governor of Indiana, two of Indiana's executive officers and all of Indiana's nine seats in the United States House of Representatives.

President of the United States

United States Senate

United States House of Representatives

Governor

Attorney General

Incumbent Republican Attorney General Greg Zoeller declined to run for a third term in order to run for Congress. Republicans chose Curtis Hill, Elkhart County Prosecutor since 2002 over former Attorney General Steve Carter, State Senator Randall Head, and then-deputy Attorney General Abby Kuzma at the Republican state convention on June 11, 2016

Democrats nominated Lorenzo Arredondo, former Lake County Circuit Judge from 1976–2010

Polling

General election

Results

Superintendent of Public Instruction

Incumbent Democratic Superintendent of Public Instruction Glenda Ritz ran for re-election. She was unopposed at the Democratic State Convention on June 18, 2016.

Republicans nominated Jennifer McCormick, Superintendent of Yorktown Community Schools since 2010 over Dawn Wooten, adjunct faculty at Fort Wayne-area universities.

In 2019, governor Eric Holcomb signed House Bill 1005, which would abolish the office and create an appointed position of Secretary of Education to replace it effective January 11, 2021. As a consequence, the 2016 election was the last election held for the office.

Polling

General election

Results

General Assembly
All 100 seats of the Indiana House of Representatives and 25 of 50 seats of the Indiana Senate were up for election. Before the election the composition of the Indiana General Assembly was:

Senate

House of Representatives

References

 
Indiana